Proximity effect may refer to:
Proximity effect (atomic physics)
Proximity effect (audio), an increase in bass or low frequency response when a sound source is close to a microphone
Proximity Effect (comics), a comic book series written by Scott Tucker and Aron Coleite
Proximity effect (electromagnetism), magnetically induced current distortions resulting in increased effective resistance of a conductor
Proximity effect (electron beam lithography), a phenomenon in electron beam lithography (EBL)
Proximity effect (superconductivity), a term used in the field of superconductivity
 The Proximity Effect (Nada Surf album), 1998
 The Proximity Effect (Laki Mera album), 2011

See also  
 Pressure sensitive (disambiguation)